Jesper Westerlin Nielsen is a Danish film director and editor, known for films like The Bouncer, Okay, and Pagten. He also wrote the 2008 series Sommer with Karina Dam.

In 1989, Nielsen graduated as a film editor from Den Danske Filmskole and edited feature films by Anders Refn, Thomas Vinterberg and Erik Clausen. Nielsen became noted as a director of children's films, such as Retfærdigheden rytter (1989), The Last Viking (1997) and Forbudt for børn (1998). In 2003, Nielsen made his breakthrough with the critically acclaimed adult drama film Okay for which Nielsen was awarded the Dreyer Award.

Filmography

References

External links

Danish film directors
Living people
1962 births